It Won't Be Christmas Without You is the first Christmas music album by country group Brooks & Dunn released in 2002. Their first album of Christmas music, it features covers of traditional Christmas songs, as well as several newly written tunes. Four of the album's songs — "Hangin' 'Round the Mistletoe", the title track, "Rockin' Little Christmas" and "Winter Wonderland" — received enough airplay to enter the Billboard country music charts, peaking at numbers 47, 41, 57 and 57, respectively.

The album received a 3 star rating from Allmusic, with an unattributed review praising Brooks & Dunn for "wisely foregoing the drippy, synth-laden production that ruins many contemporary country Christmas albums, instead relying on the neo-honky tonk sound that made the duo famous."

Track listing
 "Winter Wonderland" (Felix Bernard, Richard B. Smith) – 3:00
 "Hangin' 'Round the Mistletoe" (Kostas) – 2:41
 "It Won't Be Christmas Without You" (Steven Busch, Ronnie Dunn, Jerry Lynn Williams) – 3:43
 "Rockin' Little Christmas" (Deborah Allen, Bruce Channel) – 3:06
 "Blue Christmas" (Billy Hayes, Jay W. Johnson)– 3:29
 "Santa's Coming Over to Your House" (Kix Brooks, Don Cook) – 2:32
 "The Christmas Song" (Mel Tormé, Robert Wells) – 2:56
 "Santa Claus Is Coming to Town" (John Frederick Coots, Haven Gillespie) – 2:24
 "Who Says There Ain't No Santa" (Brooks, Larry Boone, Paul Nelson) – 3:41
 "I'll Be Home for Christmas" (Kim Gannon, Walter Kent, Buck Ram) – 2:42
 "White Christmas" (Irving Berlin) – 2:46

Personnel

Brooks & Dunn
 Kix Brooks - lead vocals, background vocals
 Ronnie Dunn - lead vocals, background vocals

Additional Musicians
 Deborah Allen - background vocals
 Bekka Bramlett - background vocals
 David Campbell - string arrangements, conductor
 Bruce Channel - background vocals
 Lisa Cochran - background vocals
 Eric Darken - percussion
 Dan Dugmore - steel guitar
 Shannon Forrest - drums
 Paul Franklin - steel guitar
 Barry Green - trombone
 Kenny Greenberg - electric guitar
 Mike Haynes - trumpet
 Aubrey Haynie - fiddle, mandolin
 Jim Horn - baritone saxophone
 B. James Lowry - acoustic guitar
 Brent Mason - electric guitar
 The Nashville String Machine - strings
 Steve Nathan - keyboards, Hammond organ, piano
 Steve Patrick - trumpet
 Michael Rhodes - bass guitar
 Brent Rowan - electric guitar
 John Wesley Ryles - background vocals
 Denis Solee - tenor saxophone
 Harry Stinson - background vocals

Charts

Weekly charts

Year-end charts

References

2002 Christmas albums
Brooks & Dunn albums
Arista Records Christmas albums
Christmas albums by American artists
Country Christmas albums
Albums produced by Mark Wright (record producer)
Albums produced by Greg Droman